Morbo was a Mexican electronic/synthpop/ambient/alternative rock group formed by Juan Carlos Lozano. Lozano was one of the four founding members of Mœnia, which originally included Juan Carlos Lozano as lead guitarist on their failed 1992 debut album Moenia, later on as lead vocalist on their official eponymous 1996 debut Mœnia and its 1998 companion remix album Mœnia Mixes. Despite the acclaimed success at the time in a risky and previously-unnoticed novelty in the Mexican music industry, and due to disagreements between Lozano, Jorge Soto and Alejandro 'Midi' Ortega as to the creative route Mœnia should take, Lozano decided to leave Mœnia as vocalist with original founding member Alfonso Pichardo returning as lead singer. Lozano then formed the perhaps less commercial, still synth-oriented, but more guitar-centered Morbo, whose musical vision first came to fruition in 2001's eponymous Morbo.

The musical and lyrical vision of Morbo has continued to deepen and evolve with 2005's Electroguitarpop. Both Morbo and Moenia have expressed that both bands are not in competition with one another, since each band's aesthetic visions and realizations are demonstrably different.

Members
Juan Carlos Lozano
Cofounder and former lead guitarist / vocalist of Mœnia. Founder and lead vocalist of Morbo.
Yamil Rezc
Guitar
Abie Toiber
Bass
Jordi Alcobe

Discography
Morbo (2001) EMI
Electroguitarpop (2005) Phoenix
  Este Encanto (Single) (2005) Phoenix
Nada Haces Por Mi (2011) Unknown

External links
https://web.archive.org/web/20070927080215/http://www.rollingstone.com.mx/larevista.asp?id=190295
https://web.archive.org/web/20110527120612/http://www.juancarloslozano.com/

Mexican electronic musical groups
Mexican rock music groups